The Roots of Heaven is a 1958 American adventure film made for 20th Century Fox, directed by John Huston and produced by Darryl F. Zanuck. The screenplay by Romain Gary and Patrick Leigh Fermor is based on Romain Gary's 1956 Prix Goncourt-winning novel of the same name. The film stars Errol Flynn, Juliette Gréco, Trevor Howard, Eddie Albert, Orson Welles, Paul Lukas, Herbert Lom and Grégoire Aslan. Huston later said that Roots of Heaven "could have been a very fine film. And largely owing to me was not a good film at all."

Plot
In French Equatorial Africa, crusading environmentalist Morel sets out to preserve the elephants from extinction as a lasting symbol of freedom for all humanity. He is helped by Minna, a nightclub hostess, and Forsythe, a disgraced British military officer hoping to redeem himself.

Cast

 Errol Flynn as Maj. Forsythe
 Juliette Gréco as Minna
 Trevor Howard as Morel
 Eddie Albert as Abe Fields
 Orson Welles as Cy Sedgewick
 Paul Lukas as Saint Denis
 Herbert Lom as Orsini
 Grégoire Aslan as Habib
 André Luguet as Governor
 Frederick Ledebur as Peer Qvist
 Edric Connor as Waitari
 Oliver Hussenot as The Baron
 Pierre Dudan as Maj. Scholscher
 Marc Doelnitz as De Vries
 Francis de Wolff as Father Fargue
 Dan Jackson as Madjumba
 Maurice Cannon as Haas
 Jacques Marin as Cerisot
 Alain Saury as A.D.C.

Production

Development
20th Century Fox bought the film rights the novel in April 1957 for more than $100,000. The novel had sold over 300,000 copies in Europe but had not yet been released in the U.S., where it would become a bestseller. In May, Darryl F. Zanuck announced that he would produce the film independently for Fox (he had a contract with the studio to make films), and wanted John Huston to direct. Zanuck said that the theme of the film was "simple... A man comes to the conclusion that if we don't stop killing people we destroy ourselves." And he says, "Why not start with our biggest companions on earth, the elephants, whose only enemy is man?" He later added:
This picture is really great for us – intellectually great. Whether it's commercially great, whether people will grab on to it, we must wait and see. If they grab on to a man in love with a bridge, then why shouldn't they grab on to a man in love with an elephant?
Huston said that he wanted to direct the novel before Zanuck approached him:
After my experience with Selznick [on A Farewell to Arms] – all those memorandum! – I'd sworn never to work with a producer again, but I did want very much to make this particular film. So we met several times and talked it through and finally agreed to try it.
Huston agreed to direct for a fee he described as "slightly higher" than $300,000. Regarding the irony of a big-game hunter like Huston making a film about a militant elephant conservationist, Huston said: "Contrary to prevailing opinion, I never found an elephant big enough to justify the sin of killing one." Zanuck visited the Belgian Congo in late 1957 to scout locations.

Casting
William Holden was mentioned as a possibility for the lead part of Morel, as was James Mason. Holden wanted to take the role but he was under contract to Paramount, which would not permit him to make the film unless he signed another contract, but he refused.

The lead role was taken by Trevor Howard. Errol Flynn signed to play a key support role but was given top billing. Flynn left the cast of the play The Master of Thornfield to appear in the film. Flynn and John Huston had famously brawled at a Hollywood party more than a decade earlier.

Juliette Gréco, who had appeared in Zanuck's version of The Sun Also Rises and became his lover, was signed as the female lead. Eddie Albert and Paul Lukas rounded out the main cast. Orson Welles signed on for a cameo role.

Shooting
Shooting took place mainly on location in French Equatorial Africa over five months in the Belgian Congo and Chad in the Northern Cameroons, where the elephants were located. The cast and crew suffered from heat, malaria and other tropical diseases. Temperatures would routinely reach  in the day and  degrees at night, and people would shower four or five times per night. Some days required a four-hour drive to the location and back, and all water was transported to the set by aircraft. Juliette Gréco contracted a serious illness and the company reported 900 sick calls from a cast and crew of 120. Flynn mentioned the challenges of the location with affection in his autobiography My Wicked, Wicked Ways (1959).

Zanuck said "I would never make a picture there again" but he was proud that "[t]here is not one dubbed line, transparency plate or process shot in the whole picture."

The unit then moved to Paris for studio filming. While there, Gréco fell ill with a recurrence of her illness. Flynn also had a recurrence of malaria requiring hospitalization.

Welles filmed his part over two days at a Paris studio. His rate was normally $15,000, but he was not paid because he wished to reciprocate Zanuck for helping Welles fund Othello (1952).

Huston later said: "I still don't want to have to work with a producer again but if I had to, I'd certainly choose Darryl. He's been very good, co-operative and decent throughout." He also said that he was "completely responsible... for the badness of The Roots of Heaven. I really wanted to make that one and Daryl Zanuck got me everything and everybody I wanted. But I had the screenplay done by someone who had never done one before, and it was bad. By then the cast, crew and me were in Africa; it was too late to turn back, we would have spent a fortune for nothing, so we went ahead and did the best we could."

Post-production
The film was edited in London rather than Paris so that Zanuck could be near Gréco, who was making a film there.

Reception

Box office
The film earned rentals of $3 million in the United States and Canada and recorded admissions of 1,266,452 in France.

Critical
The Los Angeles Times wrote that "John Huston may have bitten off more than he could chew in 'The Roots of Heaven', but much of it makes for thoughtful mastication... it sometimes seems too strange to be real." Bosley Crowther wrote in the New York Times that "[t]he first two-thirds of 'The Roots of Heaven' … looks like a highly potential adventure film" but that "the final third of the film goes down the drain"—a conclusion "the more disappointing—and strangely surprising, indeed—because the elements, up to this point, have seemed so beautifully under control."

Filmink called the film "possibly the first big budget studio film about an eco-terrorist (unless you count Tarzan movies)."

Release

Home Media
The film was first released to Blu-ray in 2011 by Twilight Time (home video label) in a limited edition of 3,000 units. The only special feature on the disc is an isolated score track.

See also
 List of American films of 1958

References

Bibliography
 Flynn, E. My Wicked, Wicked Ways. G.P. Putnam's Sons 1959, Pan Books 1961 in association with William Heinemann Ltd, 5th Printing 1979.
 Norman, B. The Hollywood Greats. Arrow Books, 1988 edition.
 Solomon, Aubrey. Twentieth Century Fox: A Corporate and Financial History (The Scarecrow Filmmakers Series). Lanham, Maryland: Scarecrow Press, 1989. .
 Thomas, T. Behlmer, R. & McCarty, C. The Films of Errol Flynn. Citadel Press. 1969.

External links
 
 
 
 
 

1950s adventure drama films
20th Century Fox films
American adventure drama films
1950s English-language films
Films about animal rights
Films based on French novels
Films based on works by Romain Gary
Films directed by John Huston
Films about hunters
Films set in Africa
Films set in the French colonial empire
Films produced by Darryl F. Zanuck
Films about elephants
Films shot in Chad
Films scored by Malcolm Arnold
1958 drama films
1958 films
1950s American films